Lauren Mabry  (b. 1985, Cincinnati, Ohio) is an American artist known for ceramic art. Mabry was born in Cincinnati and grew up in Madison, Wisconsin She attended the Kansas City Art Institute and the University of Nebraska–Lincoln. She is the recipient of a grant from the Pew Center for Arts & Heritage. She was awarded the National Council on Education for the Ceramic Arts (NCECA) Emerging Artist award in 2014.

Her work is in the collection of the Daum Museum of Contemporary Art and the Nelson-Atkins Museum of Art. Her exhibits include the solo exhibit, "Cylinders" at the Nerman Museum of Contemporary Art in 2012, the group exhibit, "Form Over Function," at the Pentimenti Gallery in 2019, and the group exhibit, "Reminiscing the Now: Directions in Contemporary Clay" at the Gallery at University of Texas, Austin in 2022.

Her work, Glazescape (Green Shade), was acquired by the Smithsonian American Art Museum as part of the Renwick Gallery's 50th Anniversary Campaign,This Present Moment: Crafting a Better World.

References

1985 births
Living people
Artists from Cincinnati
21st-century women artists